A  vote of no confidence, also variously called a motion of no confidence, no-confidence motion, motion of confidence, or vote of confidence, is a statement or vote about whether a person in a position of responsibility like in government or management is still deemed fit to hold that position, such as because they are inadequate in some aspect, fail to carry out their obligations, or make decisions that other members feel to be detrimental. The parliamentary motion demonstrates to the head of government that the elected parliament either has or no longer has confidence in one or more members of the appointed government. In some countries, a no-confidence motion being passed against an individual minister requires the minister to resign. In most cases, if the minister in question is the premier, all other ministers must also resign.

A censure motion is different from a no-confidence motion. Depending on the constitution of the body concerned, "no confidence" may lead to the dismissal of the council of ministers or other position-holders and often the dissolution of most of the leadership of the executive branch. On the other hand, "censure" is meant to show disapproval and does not result in the resignation of ministers. The motion of censure may be against an individual minister or a group of ministers. However, depending on a country's constitution, a no-confidence motion may be more directed against the entire cabinet. Again, depending on the applicable rules, censure motions may need to state the reasons for the motion, but specific reasons may not be required for no-confidence motions.

Parliamentary systems
There are a number of variations in this procedure between parliaments. In some countries, a motion of no confidence can be directed at the government collectively or at any individual member, including the prime minister. Sometimes, motions of no confidence are proposed even though they have no likelihood of passage simply to pressure a government or to embarrass its own critics, who may for political reasons decide not to vote against it.

In many parliamentary democracies, there are strict time limits for no-confidence motions such as being allowed only once every three, four, or six months. Thus, the timing of a motion of no confidence is a matter of political judgment. A motion of no confidence on a relatively trivial matter may then prove counterproductive if a more important issue suddenly arises that actually warrants a motion of no confidence. Sometimes, the government chooses to declare that one of its bills is a "motion of confidence" to prevent dissident members of its own party from voting against it.

Australia
In the Australian Parliament, a motion of no confidence requires a majority of the members present in the House of Representatives to agree to it. The House of Representatives has 151 members and so requires 76 votes in favour of the motion when all members of the House are present. A straight vote of no confidence in the Australian government and a motion or amendment censuring a government have never been successful in the House of Representatives. However, governments have on eight occasions resigned or advised a dissolution after their defeat on other questions before the House. The last time that a government resigned after being defeated in the House came in October 1941, when the House rejected the budget of Arthur Fadden's minority government.

Specific motions of no confidence or censure against the prime minister, ministers, the leader of the opposition, senators and leaders of political parties have been successful on some occasions. Motions of no confidence against the government may be passed in the Senate but have little or no impact in the House. However, the Senate's right to refuse supply helped spark the 1975 Australian constitutional crisis. The convention remains a grey area, as Westminster governments are not normally expected to maintain the confidence of the upper house.

Bangladesh
In the Parliament of Bangladesh, there is no provision to hold motions of no confidence, as a result of Article 70 of the Constitution of Bangladesh, which prohibits members of Parliament from voting against their party and made the removal of a sitting government unattainable.

Canada
In Canada, a vote of confidence is a motion that the legislature approves and consents to be ruled by the governing prime minister or provincial premier and the incumbent Cabinet. A no-confidence motion may be directed against only the incumbent government in the legislature, with votes of no-confidence against the legislature's Official Opposition being inadmissible. Originating as a constitutional convention, it remains an uncodified practice which is not outlined in any standing orders for the House of Commons.

At the federal level, a vote of no confidence in a motion presented by a member of the House of Commons explicitly states the House has no confidence in the incumbent government. The government may also declare any bill or motion to be a question of confidence. Several motions and bills are also considered implicit motions on confidence, and a vote of no confidence may be asserted automatically if such a bill fails to pass. Bills and motions that are considered implicit motions of confidence include appropriations or supply bills, motions concerning budgetary policy, and the Address in Reply to the Speech from the Throne. The failure to pass those bills may be used as an automatic assertion of a vote of no confidence, but the opposition is not obligated to assert the failure as a non-confidence motion against the government.

If a vote of no confidence passes, the prime minister is required to either resign or request the governor-general to dissolve parliament and call a general election. The governor-general may refuse a request for dissolution if an election has recently been held or there is another leader who can likely gain the confidence of the House. If a dissolution request is refused, the prime minister must resign, and the governor-general invites the leader of another coalition/party to form a new government. Six motions of no confidence have been passed in the House of Commons: in 1926, 1963, 1974, 1979, 2005, and 2011. All successful votes of no confidence in the 20th century were the result of a loss of supply; votes of no confidence in 2005 and 2011 were the result of explicit confidence motions presented by the opposition.

The confidence convention is also present in the provincial legislatures of Canada, operating much like their federal counterpart. However, the decision to dissolve the legislature and call an election or to see if another coalition/party can form a government is left to the provincial lieutenant-governor.

Two Canadian territories, the Northwest Territories and Nunavut, operate as a consensus government system in which the premier is chosen by the members of the nonpartisan legislature. If a vote of no confidence against the incumbent government passes, the premier and the cabinet are removed from office, and the legislature elects a new premier. In a consensus government, confidence motions may be directed against any individual ministers holding office as they are also nominated by members of the legislature.

Denmark 
Paragraph 15 of the Danish Constitution states that "A Minister shall not remain in office after the Folketing has passed a vote of no confidence in him." and that "When the Folketing passes a vote of no confidence in the Prime Minister, he shall ask for the dismissal of the Ministry unless writs are to be issued for a general election." The vote requires a simple majority.

Votes of no confidence against the government are rare in Denmark, only occurring in 1909, 1947 and 1975. Generally the government will resign or call for an election before a vote of no confidence.

European Union
The European Parliament can dismiss the European Commission, the executive body of the European Union, through a successful motion of no confidence, which requires a two-thirds vote. A successful vote on the motion leads to the resignation of the entire Commission.

Germany

In Germany, a vote of no confidence in the federal chancellor requires the opposition, on the same ballot, to propose a candidate of its own whom it wants the federal president to appoint as its successor. Thus, a motion of no confidence may be brought forward only if there is a positive majority for the new candidate. The idea was to prevent the state crises that occurred near the end of the German Weimar Republic. Frequently, chancellors were then turned out of the office without their successors having enough parliamentary support to govern. Unlike the British system, chancellors do not have to resign in response to the failure of a vote of confidence if it has been initiated by them, rather than by the parliamentary opposition, but they may ask the president to call general elections, a request that the president decides on whether to fulfill.

Greece
The Parliament may, by its decision, withdraw its confidence from the Government or from a member of it. A motion of no confidence can only be submitted six months after the Parliament has rejected a previous one. The motion must be signed by at least one-sixth of the members and must clearly state the issues to be debated. A motion of no confidence is accepted only if it is approved by the absolute majority of the total number of members.

India
In India, a motion of no confidence can be introduced only in the Lok Sabha (the lower house of the Parliament of India) and after at least 50 members of Parliament support it, the Speaker may grant a leave and after considering the state of business in the House, allot a day or days or part of a day for the discussion of the motion (under sub-rule (2) and (3) of rule 198 of Lok Sabha Rules, 16th edition). If the motion carries, the House debates and votes on the motion. If a majority of the members vote in favour of the motion, it is passed, and the government is bound to vacate the office. Acharya Kripalani moved the first-ever no-confidence motion on the floor of the Lok Sabha in August 1963, immediately after the disastrous Sino-Indian War. As of July 2019, 27 no-confidence motions have been moved. Prime Minister Indira Gandhi faced the most no-confidence motions (15), followed by Lal Bahadur Shastri and P. V. Narasimha Rao (three each), Morarji Desai (two) and Jawaharlal Nehru, Rajiv Gandhi, Atal Bihari Vajpayee, Narendra Modi (one each). Vajpayee lost the no-confidence motion by a margin of one vote (269–270) in April 1999. Prime Minister Desai resigned on 12 July 1979. The most recent no-confidence motion was against the Narendra Modi government and accepted by the Speaker but defeated by 325–126.

With the Anti-Defection Law, a vote of no confidence has no relevance when the majority party has an absolute majority since it can whip party members to vote in favour of the government; it is thus impossible to remove the government by a no-confidence motion. Hence, the no-confidence exercise of the house becomes a no-confidence exercise of the party.

Ireland

In Ireland, if a motion of no confidence in the Taoiseach or the government of Ireland is passed by the Dáil Éireann, and the Taoiseach and the government do not resign, the Dáil must be dissolved and a general election must be called.

Israel
The motion of no confidence is outlined in Israeli Basic Law Article 28 and Article 44 of the Knesset's Rule of Procedure.

Italy

In Italy, the government requires the support of both houses of Parliament. Within ten days of the government's formation, a confidence motion must be passed. Five governments were forced to resign when a motion of confidence in them failed to pass in one of the houses of Parliament: the eighth De Gasperi cabinet in 1953, the first Fanfani cabinet in 1954, the first Andreotti cabinet in 1972, the fifth Andreotti cabinet in 1979 and the seventh Fanfani cabinet in 1987.

Parliament can withdraw its support to the government through a vote of no confidence. A vote of no confidence may be proposed if a tenth of the members of either house sign the proposition and within three days before the appointed date, the vote can be brought into the discussion.

Since the drafting of the Constitution of Italy, Parliament has not passed any no confidence motion against the whole cabinet, as government crises often ended with prime ministers resigning after becoming aware the majority of parliament didn't support them anymore, before a no confidence motion could be put to vote or even before such a motion was presented. The only time this instrument was used was in October 1995, when the minister of justice Filippo Mancuso was forced to resign after a vote of no confidence against him passed in the Senate. The subsequent Constitutional Court sentence in 1996 declared it was indeed possible to propose an individual vote of no confidence against a single minister, instead of the whole government, and that as such, the motion Mancuso was legitimate.

|-
!colspan = "2" style = "text align:left;" | Parties
!Votes
!%
|-
|style = "background-color:#00ff00;"|
|style = "text align:left;"| Ayes
|173
|94.02
|-
|style = "background-color:#ff0000;"|
|style = "text align:left;"|Nays
|3
|1.63
|-
|style="background-color:#eeeeee;"|
|style = "text align:left;"|Abstentions
|8
|4.34
|-
|}

The government can also make any vote a matter of confidence. In the entire history of the Republic of Italy, only two governments were forced to resign when a vote they had made a matter of confidence failed: the first Prodi cabinet in 1996, and the second Prodi cabinet in 2006. In both cases, the vote made a matter of confidence was a vote on a resolution approving the prime minister's address to one of the houses of Parliament.

Japan
Article 69 of the 1947 Constitution of Japan provides that "if the House of Representatives passes a non-confidence resolution, or rejects a confidence resolution, the Cabinet shall resign en masse, unless the House of Representatives is dissolved within ten (10) days."

Malaysia 
In Malaysia's federal political system, votes of confidence in state legislative assemblies of Malaysia have removed its heads of state governments four times, most recently Faizal Azumu's Perak ministry in 2020. During the 2020–2022 Malaysian political crisis, opposition members of Parliament demanded a vote of confidence in Prime Minister Muhyiddin Yassin, but he resigned before this could take place.

Pakistan
The Constitution of Pakistan has provision for a no-confidence motion in all constituents of the Electoral College of the state. The motions can target speakers and deputy speakers of provincial and national assemblies, the prime minister, chief ministers of provinces, as well as the chairman and deputy chairman of Senate. Before it can be put for a vote on the pertinent house's floor, it must have the backing of at least 20% of the elected members in all cases except those moved against speakers or deputy speakers in which case there is no minimum. After being put to vote, the motion is deemed to be successful only if passed by a majority.

The no-confidence procedure has historically been mostly used to remove speakers and deputy speakers. Of the 11 times that the motion has been invoked, nine cases targeted those posts, with four being effective. Votes of no confidence in prime ministers are extremely rare. In November 1989, Benazir Bhutto faced an ultimately unsuccessful motion of no confidence by Ghulam Mustafa Jatoi. Same is the case for provincial chief ministers, as the only instance of its use is the one moved in January 2018 against Sanaullah Zehri, the chief minister of Balochistan, who resigned before the vote could take place.

Since gaining independence in 1947, only Imran Khan was successfully removed as prime minister through a motion of no confidence in 2022. An earlier attempt led by the opposition was dismissed by the deputy speaker Qasim Suri using Article 5 of the constitution. Later on, President Arif Alvi dissolved the National Assembly immediately after receiving advice from Prime Minister Khan to do so, causing a constitutional crisis. On 7 April 2022, the Supreme Court of Pakistan ruled that the dismissal of the no-confidence motion, the prorogation of the National Assembly, advice of Khan to president Arif Alvi to dissolve the National Assembly and subsequent dissolution of the National Assembly were unconstitutional, and overturned these actions. On 10 April 2022, the reconvened National Assembly passed the motion of no confidence against Khan by a majority vote of 172, being the first successful ousting through no–confidence motion.

Peru
In Peru, both the legislative and the executive branches have the power to bring a motion of no confidence against acting legal members of the other branch. The president of the Cabinet may propose a motion of no confidence against any minister to Congress, which then needs more than half the Congress to approve it. The president of the republic may dissolve Congress if it has censured or denied its confidence to two Cabinets. The relevant Articles 132–134 are in the 1993 version of the Constitution of Peru.

During the 2019 Peruvian constitutional crisis, President Martín Vizcarra enacted a constitutional process on 29 May 2019 to create a motion of no confidence towards Congress if it refused to co-operate with his proposed actions against corruption.

South Africa
Any member of Parliament in the National Assembly may request a motion of no confidence in either the Cabinet, excluding the president, or the president. The Speaker, within the rules of Parliament, must add such a motion to the order paper and give it a priority. If a motion of no confidence cannot be scheduled by the last sitting day of the annual sitting, it must be the first item on the order paper of the next sitting. In the event of a successful motion, the Speaker automatically assumes the position of acting president.

On 7 August 2017, Speaker Baleka Mbete announced that she would permit a motion of no confidence in Jacob Zuma's government to proceed in the National Assembly via secret ballot. It was the eighth motion to be brought against Zuma in his presidency and the first to be held via secret ballot. After the vote was held the next day, the motion was defeated 198–177, with 25 abstentions. Around 20 governing ANC members of Parliament voted in favour of the measure.

Spain

The Spanish Constitution of 1978 provides for motions of no confidence to be proposed by one-tenth of the Congress of Deputies. Following the German model, votes of no confidence in Spain are constructive and so the motion must also include an alternative candidate for prime minister. For a motion of no confidence to be successful, it has to be carried by an absolute majority in the Congress of Deputies. At least five days must pass after the motion is registered before it can come up for a vote. Other parties may submit alternative motions within two days of the registration.

Also, the prime minister is barred from dissolving the Cortes Generales and calling a general election while a motion of no confidence is pending. If the motion is successful, the incumbent prime minister must resign. According to the Constitution, the replacement candidate named in the motion is automatically deemed to have the confidence of the Congress of Deputies and is immediately appointed as prime minister by the monarch. If the motion is unsuccessful, its signatories may not submit another motion during the same session.

The current prime minister, Pedro Sánchez, was sworn in on 2 June 2018 after a motion of no confidence against Mariano Rajoy had been approved on 1 June 2018.

Singapore
Under Article 25(1) of the Constitution of Singapore, the prime minister of Singapore must command the confidence of Parliament less NCMPs and NMPs. Since Singapore's independence on 9 August 1965, no Singaporean government has ever faced a motion of no confidence. However, Prime Minister Lee Kuan Yew faced three no-confidence motions in 1961, 1962 and 1963, all prior to independence.

The 1960s saw the ruling PAP split between the right wing led by Lee Kuan Yew and the left wing led by Lim Chin Siong. This caused PAP's massive majority to diminish. Lee Kuan Yew faced his first confidence vote on 20 July 1961 following the PAP's defeat in the Hong Lim and Anson by-elections. This motion was rather a motion of confidence tabled by the Prime Minister himself. All 51 assemblymen were present and voting. The Prime Minister won the vote by a margin of 27–8 votes. The results were as follows:

|-
!colspan = "2" style = "text align:left;" | Parties
!Votes
!%
|-
|style = "background-color:#00ff00;"|
|style = "text align:left;"| Ayes
|27
|52.94
|-
|style = "background-color:#ff0000;"|
|style = "text align:left;"|Nays
|8
|15.69
|-
|style="background-color:#eeeeee;"|
|style = "text align:left;"|Abstentions
|16
|31.37
|-
|}

However, among the 16 abstentions were 13 left wing PAP members, who were expelled from the PAP after the vote, and the 13 went on to form the Barisan Sosialis. On 13 July 1962, Barisan MP Lee Siew Choh tabled a motion of no confidence against Lee Kuan Yew. Three assemblymen were absent bringing the total membership of the Legislative Assembly to 48 present and voting. The Prime Minister won the vote by 24–16. Therefore, Lee Kuan Yew remained in office. The results for this motion of no confidence are as follows:

|-
!colspan = "2" style = "text align:left;" | Parties
!Votes
!%
|-
|style = "background-color:#00ff00;"|
|style = "text align:left;"| Ayes
|16
|33.33
|-
|style = "background-color:#ff0000;"|
|style = "text align:left;"|Nays
|24
|50.00
|-
|style="background-color:#eeeeee;"|
|style = "text align:left;"|Abstentions
|8
|16.67
|-
|}

Lee Siew Choh tabled another motion of no confidence against Lee Kuan Yew's government on 15 June 1963 over issues regarding the proposed merger of Singapore into the Federation of Malaysia. Five members were absent from the Assembly and 1 seat was vacant bringing the total membership down to 45 present and voting. This time, Lee Kuan Yew's Government won the vote by a margin of 23–16. The results are as follows:

|-
!colspan = "2" style = "text align:left;" | Parties
!Votes
!%
|-
|style = "background-color:#00ff00;"|
|style = "text align:left;"| Ayes
|16
|35.56
|-
|style = "background-color:#ff0000;"|
|style = "text align:left;"|Nays
|23
|51.11
|-
|style="background-color:#eeeeee;"|
|style = "text align:left;"|Abstentions
|6
|13.33
|-
|}

In September 1963, the Legislative Assembly was dissolved and fresh elections were called. The rump PAP won the election with a two-thirds majority therefore staving off any further attempts by the Barisan Sosialis to move further motions of no confidence. Following merger and separation (1963–1965), and with Barisan's boycott of Parliament, the PAP was the dominant party in Parliament and motions of no confidence became "rare", in fact "non-existent". Further, Lee Kuan Yew's 1961 motion of confidence remains the only time that a Singaporean prime minister has ever tabled a motion of confidence in his own government.

Sweden
A motion of no confidence may be levelled against either the prime minister on behalf of the entire Swedish government or against an individual lower-level minister.  At least 35 members of parliament (MPs) must support a proposal to initiate such a vote. A majority of MPs (175 members) must vote for a motion of no confidence for it to be successful. An individual minister who loses a confidence vote must resign. If a prime minister loses a no-confidence vote, the entire government must resign. The speaker may allow the ousted prime minister to head a transitional or caretaker government until Parliament elects a new prime minister.

Under the principle of negative parliamentarism, a prime ministerial candidate nominated by the Speaker does not need the confidence of a majority of MPs to be elected. However, a majority of MPs must not vote against the candidate, which renders prime ministerial votes similar to no-confidence votes. That means that a prime ministerial candidate, to be successful in the parliamentary vote,  must have at least a total of 175 votes in favour or abstention. If a Speaker fails four times to have a nominee elected, an election must be held within three months of the final vote.

United Kingdom

Traditionally, in the Westminster system, the defeat of a supply bill, which concerns the spending of money, is seen to require automatically for the government to resign or ask for a new election, much like a no-confidence vote. A government in a Westminster system that cannot spend money is hamstrung, which is also called a loss of supply.

In the British Parliament, a no-confidence motion generally first appeared as an early day motion although the vote on the Speech from the Throne was also a confidence motion. However, from 2011 to 2022, under the then-Fixed-term Parliaments Act 2011, only a motion explicitly resolving that "this House has no confidence in His Majesty's Government" was treated as a motion of no confidence.

Semi-presidential systems
In semi-presidential systems, the legislature may occasionally pass motions of no confidence, which removes only the cabinet and the prime minister. The legislature may also have the power to impeach an executive or judicial officer, with another institution or the legislature removing the officer from their office.

Russia
In Russia, the lower house of the Federal Assembly (the State Duma) may by a simple majority (at least 226 votes out of 450) pass a motion of no confidence against the government of Russia as a whole. In that case, the matter goes for consideration of the Russian president, who may choose to dismiss the cabinet, which he can do anyway anytime at his own discretion, or just ignore the Duma's decision. If the Duma passes a second motion of no confidence against the same composition of the cabinet within three months, the president is forced to make a concrete decision on whether to dismiss the government or to dissolve the Duma itself and call for new general elections. The State Duma may not be dissolved on those grounds if it was elected less than a year earlier, if it has already initiated impeachment proceedings against the president himself by bringing respective accusations, if less than six months remain left until presidential elections, or if there is a state of emergency or martial law throughout the whole territory of Russia. In the above-mentioned cases, the president is then effectively forced to dismiss the government.

France
In France, the lower house of French Parliament (the National Assembly) may by a majority of the entire membership pass a motion of no confidence, against the French government as a whole. In that case, the government is removed from power, and the president has to appoint a new prime minister, who then has to form a new government.

During the Third Republic, members of both the Senate and Chamber of Deputies could, with a simple interpellation and a vote, force the government into resigning, creating instability. The Fourth Republic introduced the censure motion with the majority of the membership needed to pass to replace interpellation, and removed the option of initiative by the Senate. Nevertheless, instability continued. According to historian René Rémond, President of the Council Paul Ramadier set up a precedent by submitting the composition of his government to a confidence vote after an interpellation by a deputy, despite the constitution not mentioning this process, thus recreating the problem of the preceding republic. The Fifth Republic restricted again the conditions of the motion by counting only the votes in favor of the deposition of the government, one tenth of the Assembly's membership (58 deputies) being now needed to issue such motion according to Article 49 of the constitution. Article 27 allows lawmakers to delegate their votes for the no-confidence motion if they are not available the day of the open ballot.

Sri Lanka
In Sri Lanka, the Parliament of Sri Lanka may pass a motion of no confidence against the Sri Lankan government. In that case, the government is removed from power and the president of Sri Lanka has to appoint a new prime minister, who has to form a new government.

History

The first motion of no confidence against an entire government occurred in March 1782 when, following news of the British defeat at Yorktown in the American Revolutionary War the previous October, the Parliament of Great Britain voted that it "can no longer repose confidence in the present ministers". British Prime Minister Lord North responded by asking King George III to accept his resignation. That did not immediately create a constitutional convention. Although it is considered the first formal motion of no confidence, Sir Robert Walpole's resignation after a defeat on a vote in the House of Commons in 1742 is considered to be the first de facto motion of no confidence.

During the early 19th century, attempts by prime ministers, such as Robert Peel, to govern in the absence of a parliamentary majority proved unsuccessful, and by the mid-19th century, the power of a motion of no confidence to break a government was firmly established in the UK.

In the United Kingdom, 11 prime ministers have been defeated through a no-confidence motion, but there has been only one such motion since 1925, in 1979 (against James Callaghan).

In modern times, the passage of a motion of no confidence is a relatively rare event in two-party democracies. In almost all cases, party discipline is sufficient to allow a majority party to defeat a motion of no confidence, and if faced with possible defections in the government party, the government is likely to change its policies, rather than lose a vote of no confidence. The cases in which a motion of no confidence has passed are generally those in which the government party's slim majority has been eliminated by either by-elections or defections, such as the 1979 vote of no confidence in the Callaghan ministry in the UK which was carried by one vote and forced a general election, which was won by Margaret Thatcher's Conservative Party.

Motions of no confidence are far more common in multi-party systems in which a minority party must form a coalition government. That can mean that there have been many short-lived governments because the party structure allows small parties to defeat a government without the means to create a government. This has widely been regarded as the cause of instability for the French Fourth Republic and the German Weimar Republic. More recent examples have been in Italy between the 1950s and 1990s, Israel, and Japan.

To deal with that situation, the French placed a greater degree of executive power in the office of the French president, along with a two-round plurality voting system, which makes it easier to form a stable majority government. Furthermore, since 2014, the French president can be impeached only if three conditions are fulfilled : one of the Houses of the French parliament must adopt a sitting in High Court proposal with a two-third majority, then the other house has to follow suit in a 15-days period, then two third of the members of the High Court have to vote in favor of the president's impeachment during a one-month period where the Court must decide. The president still pursue the exercise of his functions during the process.

In 2008, Canadian Prime Minister Stephen Harper, of the re-elected minority government of Canada, successfully requested Canadian Governor-general Michaëlle Jean to prorogue Parliament. That allowed Harper to delay a potential vote on the no-confidence motion presented by the opposition. (See 2008–2009 Canadian parliamentary dispute.) Three years later, in 2011, Harper's minority government was defeated by a motion of no confidence, which declared the government to be in contempt of Parliament and led to an election that year.

In 2013, during the Euromaidan pro-European riots, the opposition in Ukraine called for a motion of no confidence against the Cabinet of Ministers, led by the pro-Russian and eurosceptic Prime Minister Mykola Azarov. At least 226 votes were needed to gain a majority in Ukraine's Verkhovna Rada. However, it fell 40 votes short, and Azarov's government prevailed.

On 1 June 2018, in Spain, the government of Mariano Rajoy was ousted after a motion of no confidence passed 180–169 after the sentence of the Gürtel corruption scandal, which involved the ruling party. Pedro Sánchez was sworn in as the new Spanish prime minister. That was the first time in the history of Spain that a vote of no confidence resulted in a change of government.

On 25 September 2018, Swedish Prime Minister Stefan Löfven was ousted after he lost a vote of no confidence in the Riksdag after an election was held on 9 September. The center-left bloc led by Löfven's Social Democratic Party won only 144 seats in parliament, 31 seats short of an absolute majority, and just one seat more than the opposition Alliance for Sweden bloc. The Sweden Democrats, having just won 62 seats, also voted with the main opposition bloc's motion of no confidence.

On 8 March 2022, opposition parties filed the motion against then prime minister of Pakistan Imran Khan. Out of 346, 172 votes have required to gain the majority in national assembly of Pakistan. On 10 April 2022, motion of no confidence was passed by 174 votes out of 346. This was the first time in the history of Pakistan that vote of no confidence resulted in a change of government.

See also
Impeachment
Constructive vote of no confidence
Interpellation
Motions of no confidence in the United Kingdom

References

 
Voting